is a vertical shoot 'em up arcade game by Cave. It was released in Japanese arcades in 2003. A Nintendo DS boss rush version was released on October 23, 2008 in Japan. It included a Superplay DVD featuring a world record scoring run by a top ranked player. The arcade game was ported to the Xbox 360 and released in 2010. A special version of Dodonpachi Daifukkatsu Black Label was released on the Xbox 360 in 2011, which is a crossover with Ketsui, featuring the ship, re-arranged music and scoring system from Ketsui on top of the Dodonpachi Daifukkatsu Black Label scoring system.

Gameplay

Scoring
Ketsuis scoring system centers around numbered "chips" that are dropped from defeated enemies. Each chip bears a number from 1 to 5, signifying their value, which gets added to the player's accumulated total of chip points when collected. The value of a chip is dependent on the player's proximity to the enemy when it is destroyed using the player's normal shots. For example, destroying an enemy from far away will yield lower-value chips (such as 1s and 2s) while destroying enemies at close range will yield higher-value chips (such as 4s and 5s). When a chip whose value is higher than 1 is obtained, a counter will appear in the upper-left of the screen and quickly count down from 60 to 0. While this counter is above zero, every enemy destroyed with the player's lock-on shots will drop chips with the same value as the chip collected that was higher than 1, regardless of proximity. For example, if the player destroys an enemy at point-blank with his/her normal shots and receives a 5-value chip, then quickly switches to their lock-on shots, every enemy destroyed will yield 5-valued chips, regardless of proximity and so long as the counter stays above 0. When the counter hits 0, every enemy destroyed with lock-on shots will only yield 1-valued chips, though the player can keep replenishing the counter by quickly collecting more chips that are valued higher than 1.

However, while using the lock-on shot, the player will lose a small number of his/her accumulated chip points per enemy defeated, forcing the player to balance between normal and lock-on shots in order to obtain the highest number of accumulated chips possible per stage. At the end of each stage when the player faces the boss, the player's total number of chips will slowly deplete throughout the duration of the boss battle. The number of chips remaining at the end of the boss battle will act as a multiplier and greatly increase the player's end-of-level score, thus defeating the boss quickly will yield a higher multiplier.

Fighters
AH-Y72 Tiger Schwert: Fires in wide formation, slow movement, fast lock-on, Lloyd Evansmann and Alice Blackbarn
FH-X4 Panzer Jäger: Fires in straight formation, fast movement, slow lock-on, Steele Yurek and Yuma Nanase

Stages1. Noisy Town - INTERCEPTIONA fortified city under EVAC's direct control. A pedestrian bridge, state-of-the-art skyscrapers, a stadium with a large baseball field and even an indoor sky slope; however, the roads and structures are littered with enemy aircraft and artillery emplacements, hidden and ready to strike.Sub-Boss: Medium-sized and pontoon-equipped helicopter Sea HorseBoss: "Air superiority" large combat helicopter Bullfrog2. Armored Green - SUBURBA forward operating base hidden deep in the forest surrounding the city. This is where every model of tank at EVAC's disposal is first encountered.Sub-Boss: Large connected tanks Gem & IniBoss: Multi-tracks battle tank XM-117 Sphynx3. Twilight Fleet - CANAL FLEETAn EVAC naval base where much of its fleet are harbored, some ships being well armed, particularly one huge battleship.Sub-Boss: Multi-purpose, SRBM equipped warship RBB-S1 VinogradovBoss: V/STOL transport and attack craft Jamadhar4. Lurk in the Darkness - DEFENSIVE LINEA valley and rocky path is in the way towards EVAC's Headquarters; however, unknown to the pilots, the old staging and testing area has been extensively retrofitted and fortified in an attempt to stop their advance.Sub-Boss: Base security enforcer Black DraftBoss: Experimental modular vehicle Cinderella Amber5. Day of Judgement - EVAC INDUSTRYEVAC's vast weapons development facility, an extensive and technologically advanced complex which houses the true heart of the corrupt corporation. After descending to the lowest level and fighting through Hell, the vertigo of the final battle awaits.
Most notably, apart from the reappearance of every weaker enemy in an upgraded form, the player is to challenge the production models of his/her own attack craft: Ketsui Death Label clarifies that those "A" models are still inferior to the prototypes available to the players, lacking modifications performed on them by Alice Blackbarn, but are better armored.Sub-Boss: Tracks-mounted heavy anti-aircraft cannon "Defensive Tower Trafalgar"Boss: Heavy mobile combat fortress Evaccaneer (prototype - still in development)

Continuing with Cave's long-standing tradition, more skilled players can enter a second round of the game, consisting of the same stages with noticeably increased difficulty. There are two sets of conditions:Omote Loop: No continues. Sum of lives lost and bombs used must be 6 or less. In this mode, the scrolling direction is inverted, and all enemies release pink "suicide bullets" unless destroyed at very close range. The player cannot reach the game's true ending.Ura Loop: If the first loop is cleared with a score of over 120,000,000 points with no deaths and no bombs deployed, the WELCOME TO SPECIAL ROUND message is displayed and the Ura game begins. In this mode, all enemies fire approximately double the number of shots, and release blue suicide bullets unless destroyed at very close range. After destroying Evaccaneer again, the player is forced to challenge the game's "true" last boss, Evaccaneer DOOM. This battle has a hidden time limit of 180 seconds, and the player cannot using continues during the battle, it means if the player is losing all lives during the battle will getting an instant Game Over.

Plot
In the year 2054, chaos spreads over the globe as global warming finally exacts its toll on Earth: the ice caps quickly melt, causing a tremendous series of cataclysms and for entire nations to disappear under the sea. The near apocalyptic setting and the quickly depleting resources of the remaining dry lands force nations into constant war, eventually culminating into World War III; all efforts by the United Nations to cease hostilities are thwarted by a seemingly endless supply of technologically advanced weaponry being sold to each side of every conflict. After investigation, the source is tracked back to EVAC Industry co. ltd, an arms dealer who's been reaping tremendously high profits from the situation, at times directly intervening to fuel the hostilities with utter disregard towards human lives; any attempt to negotiate with the board of directors has utterly failed, the earnings having proven high enough for the company to build its own cities, shipyards, defensive emplacements and even a private airport, to the point of assembling its own army of extremely well equipped mercenary troops.

Being unable to enter the fray officially, the UN sets up a strike team of four pilots, each pair given one of two advanced helicopters: the plan is to simulate a rebellion within EVAC forces and bring down the company's headquarters, where research on a series of tremendous warmachines is taking place; for this reason, the planes both bear EVAC insignia and callsigns and are built according to stolen prototype blueprints - by no means, in success or failure, must the operation be traced back to the United Nations.

However, for all this secrecy to be effective, even in victories the assault choppers will have to be destroyed... and the pilots killed. However, to compensate for their sacrifice, the UN shall fulfill one of their wishes, no matter what it is.
And this, on board a stolen EVAC carrier plane, is how the story begins...

Later releases
Arika, developer of the PlayStation 2 ports for DoDonPachi DaiOuJou and Espgaluda, had expressed interest in porting Ketsui to the PlayStation 2 as well. However, they claimed that the console was insufficient for achieving the arcade-perfect quality they sought. Specifically, the second half of stage 5 employs a quick swap of the entire background plane, coupled with reversing the overall scrolling direction ("tate-ana"). Arika claimed that this was unachievable with the standard amount of RAM and processing power of the PlayStation 2.

Mobile versions
In 2003, Cave released a mobile phone version of the game as two separate titles, available for imode (for 504/505/506 and FOMA90*i series) and Yahoo platforms. A DX version for FOMA 900 and 901 was released in 2004. The EZWeb version was released in 2005.

Danmakukenteishiken Ketsui Hen (弾幕検定死験 -ケツイ編-) is a spin-off title based on Ketsui, released in 2006 for imode. This version is a boss battle version of the game, emphasizing on dodging bullets. The player's goal is to earn ranks by repeatedly defeating the same boss, but with increasing difficulty in successive runs.

Nintendo DS release
On 2007-3-26, Arika's vice president Ichiro Mihara mentioned the release of Nintendo DS version of Ketsui in his personal page . The game, subtitled Death Label, was available for download in test events on March 31, 2007. Video footage of the game was also released by Mihara. In the time-limited demo, players had 120 minutes to face off against Doom with a single ship and no bombs. Another demo event took place at Cave Festival in Akihabara on September 23 and 24, 2007. This version has a time limit of 24 hours, and contains extra levels. The retail version of the game was released in Japan in 2008 and includes a DVD Superplay video with the then current world record of the arcade release using Ship A.

The game adds the ability to save replays, which can be sent to other Nintendo DS units. In addition, it can upload the Ketsui demo game to other game consoles via Download Play. The EVAC Report feature allows players to unlock up to 113 panels covering the 11 bosses' artworks when specific conditions are met, some as simple as changing the sound options or touching all four corners of the screen with the ship, others as complex as defeating a boss in under 15 seconds or clearing Extra Mode. At times, failure to unlock a panel within a certain deadline might partially unlock it, revealing a grayed portion of the picture and what is required to unlock that portion; clearing modes, uncovering entire pictures and/or unlocking certain panels enables questions and replays in the Tell me! IKD-san! extra featurette.Single player modes'''
Novice: Sea Horse (mid-boss), Gem & Ini (mid-boss), Jamadhar (boss)
Normal: Black Draft (mid-boss), Bull Frog (boss), Trafalgar (mid-boss), Sphinx (boss)
Hard A: Sea Horse (mid-boss), Cinderella Amber (boss), Vinogradov (mid-boss)
Hard B: Gem & Ini (mid-boss), Sphinx (boss), Evaccaneer (last boss)
Hard C: Vinogradov (mid-boss), Trafalgar (mid-boss), Black Draft (mid-boss), Evaccaneer DOOM (true last boss)
Very Hard: All 10 bosses and mid-bosses in arcade order with the arcade's first loop difficulty.
Death Label: All 10 bosses and mid-bosses, in non-arcade order with the arcade's second loop difficulty.
Extra Mode: A graphically toned-down and remixed Stage 5 from the arcade version, preluding a fight with an exclusive, extremely difficult version of Ketsuis True Last Boss, Evaccaneer DOOM.
DOOM Mode: Five battles against an increasingly more difficult True Last Boss, Evaccaneer DOOM
Each mode is unlocked by completing the previous mode, with the exception of DOOM Mode, which is available from the start. Also, the game permanently increases the starting lives in a difficulty should the player fail to complete it.Multiplayer modeVS mode: Competes against other player for multiplier chip. When one player has a longer win/loss gauge, multiplier chip goes to that player when an enemy is destroyed.Training mode:' Allows selecting stage, boss difficulty, player's ship, ship stock, bomb stock and auto bomb.

Extra release
The March 7, 2008 issue of Famitsu Weekly magazine reported that 5pb.'s Division 2 would bring three titles, including Ketsui, to the Xbox 360 platform as Xbox Live Arcade titles. However, 5pb. representative Masaki Sakari claimed Microsoft rejected 5pb.'s proposals and 'decided to cut down faithful arcade ports'. An Xbox 360 retail version called Kizuna Jigoku Tachi Extra was to be released on May 28, 2009 in Japan, however the release date was pushed back and eventually released on April 22, 2010. The port is considered to be highly accurate both by Mihara and expert players. The port also contains an exclusive "X mode" arrange.

In May 2013, it was announced on Famitsu that a PlayStation 3 port of the Xbox 360 version would come in July. This marks the first region-free release of the full game and the first Cave title in a PlayStation console in almost a decade.

PlayStation 4 release
In April 2017, M2 announced that they were working on a port of Ketsui for PlayStation 4 as part of their M2 ShotTriggers line.

 Reception Famitsu magazine awarded Ketsui: Kizuna Jigoku Tachi Extra'' a score of 26/40 based on four reviews (6/7/7/6).

References

External links
Official websites for Arcade, Nintendo DS, and Xbox 360 / PlayStation 3 versions 
Tachyon page 

2003 video games
Arcade video games
Cave (company) games
Helicopter video games
Japan-exclusive video games
Nintendo DS games
PlayStation 3 games
PolyGame Master games
Scrolling shooters
Video games developed in Japan
Video games scored by Manabu Namiki
Video games scored by Ryu Umemoto
Xbox 360 games
World War III video games